Banca di Credito Cooperativo di Alba, Langhe, Roero e Canavese S.C. known as Banca d'Alba is an Italian cooperative bank based in Alba, Piedmont region. The bank is a member of Federazione Italiana delle Banche di Credito Cooperativo - Casse Rurali ed Artigiane (Federcasse) and Federazione delle Banche di Credito Cooperativo del Piemonte, Valle d'Aosta e Liguria. The bank own a minority interests in ICCREA Banca.

History
Banca d'Alba was founded in 1998 by the merger of Casse Rurali e Artigiana di Diano d'Alba, C.R.A. di Gallo di Grinzane Cavour and C.R.A. di Vezza d'Alba, the three rural credit unions based in the Province of Cuneo.

See also

 Cassa di Risparmio di Cuneo, a defunct bank based in Cuneo, predecessor of Banca Regionale Europea
 Banca Regionale Europea, a defunct bank based in Cuneo, now part of UBI Banca
 Cassa Rurale ed Artigiana di Boves, an Italian bank based in Boves, in the Province of Cuneo

References

External links
  

Cooperative banks of Italy
Companies based in Piedmont
Banks established in 1998
Italian companies established in 1998
Alba, Piedmont